Ian Orum (birth registered third ¼ 1955) was an English former rugby union, and professional rugby league footballer who played in the 1970s and 1980s.

Background 
Ian Orum's birth was registered in Buckrose district, East Riding of Yorkshire, in  he was the rugby league coach at The South Leeds Academy who toured Germany playing rugby union, and as of 2014 he is a Teacher in the School of Sport & Social Sciences at Carr Manor Community School, Leeds.

Playing career

County Cup Final appearances
Ian Orum played as an interchange/substitute, i.e. number 14, (replacing  Gary Hyde) in Castleford's 2-13 defeat by Hull F.C. in the 1983 Yorkshire County Cup Final during the 1983–84 season at Elland Road, Leeds, on Saturday 15 October 1983.

References

External links
Statistics at rugbyleagueproject.org

1955 births
2020 deaths
Castleford Tigers players
English rugby league players
English rugby union players
Leeds Tykes players
Rugby league five-eighths
Rugby league fullbacks
Rugby league halfbacks
Rugby league players from Yorkshire
Rugby league wingers
Rugby union players from Yorkshire
Rugby union scrum-halves
Sportspeople from the East Riding of Yorkshire